Jealous James is a 1914 American silent comedy film featuring Oliver Hardy.

Plot

Cast
 Jerold T. Hevener as Jim Jenkins
 Marguerite Ne Moyer as Clara Jenkins
 Eva Bell as Maude Mullen
 Bert Tracy as Sam (as Herbert Tracy)
 Raymond McKee as Harry
 Oliver Hardy as Grocery Boy (as Babe Hardy)

See also
 List of American films of 1914
 Oliver Hardy filmography

External links

1914 films
1914 short films
American silent short films
American black-and-white films
1914 comedy films
Films directed by Arthur Hotaling
Silent American comedy films
American comedy short films
1910s American films
1910s English-language films